The Commissioners for the Discovery of the Longitude at Sea, or more popularly Board of Longitude, was a British government body formed in 1714 to administer a scheme of prizes intended to encourage innovators to solve the problem of finding longitude at sea.

Origins
Navigators and scientists had been working on the problem of not knowing a ship's longitude. The establishment of the Board of Longitude was motivated by this problem and by the 1707 grounding of four ships of Vice-Admiral Sir Cloudesley Shovell's fleet off the Isles of Scilly, resulting in heavy loss of life. Established by Queen Anne the Longitude Act 1714 named 24 Commissioners of Longitude, key figures from politics, the Navy, astronomy and mathematics. However, the Board did not meet until at least 1737 when interest grew in John Harrison's marine timekeeper.

The Board administered prizes for those who could demonstrate a working device or method. The main longitude prizes were:
£10,000 for a method that could determine longitude within  (£ as of )
£15,000 for a method that could determine longitude within  (£ as of )
£20,000 for a method that could determine longitude within  (£ as of ).

In addition, the Board had the discretion to make awards to persons who were making significant contributions to the effort or to provide financial support to those who were working towards a solution.  The Board could also make advances of up to £2,000 for experimental work deemed promising. Under this heading, the Board  made many lesser awards, including some awards in total £5,000 made to John Harrison before he received his main prize, an award of £3,000 to the widow of Tobias Mayer, whose lunar tables were the basis of the lunar data in the early decades of The Nautical Almanac, £300 to Leonhard Euler for his (assumed) contribution to the work of Mayer, £50 each to Richard Dunthorne and Israel Lyons for contributing methods to shorten the calculations connected with lunar distances, and awards made to the designers of improvements in chronometers.

Even though many tried their hand at winning the main prize, for decades none was able to come up with a practical solution to the problem. The Board recognised that any serious attempt would be based on the recognition that the earth rotates through 15° of longitude every hour. The comparison of local time between a reference place (e.g., Greenwich) and the local time of the place in question would determine the longitude of that place.  Since local apparent time could be determined with some ease, the problem centred on finding a means of determining (or in the case of chronometers, keeping) the time of the reference place when one is far away from it.

For details of the efforts towards determining the longitude, see History of longitude.

End of the Board's mandate
For many decades a sufficiently accurate chronometer was prohibitively expensive.  The lunar distance method was used by mariners either in conjunction with or instead of the marine chronometer. However, with the expectation that accurate clocks would eventually become commonplace, John Harrison showed that his method was the way of the future. However, the board never awarded the prize to Harrison, nor anyone else.

With the significant problems considered as solved, the Board of Longitude was abolished by Act of Parliament in 1828 and replaced by a Resident Committee for Scientific Advice for the Admiralty consisting of three scientific advisors: Thomas Young, Michael Faraday and Edward Sabine.

See also 

 Longitude (book)

References

External links
National Maritime Museum, UK.
Cambridge Digital Library presents digitised works from the archive of the Royal Greenwich Observatory, held at Cambridge University Library.

Royal Navy
History of navigation
1714 establishments in Great Britain
1828 disestablishments
Meridians (geography)
Navigation organizations